Montañez is a Spanish surname.  Notable people with the surname include: 

Andy Montañez
Beatriz Montañez
Cindy Montañez
Lou Montañez
Pedro Montañez
Polo Montañez
Raphael Montañez Ortiz
Richard Montañez
Virginia Montanez
Willie Montañez

Spanish-language surnames